Kamran Rasool (born April 9, 1948) is a retired Pakistani civil servant belonging to the Pakistan Administrative Service who served in BPS-22 grade as the Cabinet Secretary of Pakistan, Chief Secretary Punjab and later on as the Defence Secretary of Pakistan. Rasool was considered to be one of the most influential civil servants during the era of General Pervez Musharraf. Rasool was promoted to the rank of Federal Secretary in May 2003.

He holds a Post Graduate Diploma in Development Administration from Manchester University and M.A in English from Punjab University.

Career
Rasool joined the Civil Services of Pakistan in 1972. He has served as deputy commissioner of Kasur, Muzaffargarh and Jhelum, and commissioner Gujranwala. He has also served as provincial secretary for food, industries and education secretary in the Government of Punjab.

Rasool served as an additional secretary in the Interior Ministry before being appointed as chairman of the Bank of Punjab. It was during his tenure as Chairman BoP that he was promoted to the highest grade of BPS-22 grade. He was thereafter posted as the Chief Secretary of Punjab in December, the administrative boss of Pakistan's largest province. Later on, he was appointed to the coveted slot of Cabinet Secretary under Prime Minister Shaukat Aziz and then as the Defence Secretary of Pakistan. As Secretary Defence, Rasool headed the Pakistani side in the Pak-India Siachen talks in 2007.

After retirement, Rasool joined MCB Bank Limited's top brass.

See also
 Nasir Mahmood Khosa
Fawad Hasan Fawad
Babar Yaqoob Fateh Muhammad
Rizwan Ahmed
Kamran Lashari
Tariq Bajwa

References

Living people
Pakistani civil servants
Government of Pakistan
Pakistani government officials
1948 births